Anthia maxillosa is a species of ground beetle in the family Carabidae.

References

Carabidae
Articles created by Qbugbot
Beetles described in 1781